Zorocrates is a genus of spiders in the family Zoropsidae. It was first described in 1888 by Simon. , it contains 31 species.

Species
Zorocrates comprises the following species:
Zorocrates aemulus Gertsch, 1935
Zorocrates alternatus Gertsch & Davis, 1936
Zorocrates apulco Platnick & Ubick, 2007
Zorocrates badius Simon, 1895
Zorocrates blas Platnick & Ubick, 2007
Zorocrates bosencheve Platnick & Ubick, 2007
Zorocrates chamela Platnick & Ubick, 2007
Zorocrates chamula Platnick & Ubick, 2007
Zorocrates chiapa Platnick & Ubick, 2007
Zorocrates colima Platnick & Ubick, 2007
Zorocrates contreras Platnick & Ubick, 2007
Zorocrates fuscus Simon, 1888
Zorocrates gnaphosoides (O. Pickard-Cambridge, 1892)
Zorocrates guerrerensis Gertsch & Davis, 1940
Zorocrates huatusco Platnick & Ubick, 2007
Zorocrates karli Gertsch & Riechert, 1976
Zorocrates mistus O. Pickard-Cambridge, 1896
Zorocrates mordax (O. Pickard-Cambridge, 1898)
Zorocrates nochix Platnick & Ubick, 2007
Zorocrates oaxaca Platnick & Ubick, 2007
Zorocrates ocampo Platnick & Ubick, 2007
Zorocrates pictus Simon, 1895
Zorocrates pie Platnick & Ubick, 2007
Zorocrates potosi Platnick & Ubick, 2007
Zorocrates soledad Platnick & Ubick, 2007
Zorocrates sotano Platnick & Ubick, 2007
Zorocrates tequila Platnick & Ubick, 2007
Zorocrates terrell Platnick & Ubick, 2007
Zorocrates unicolor (Banks, 1901)
Zorocrates xilitla Platnick & Ubick, 2007
Zorocrates yolo Platnick & Ubick, 2007

References

Zoropsidae
Araneomorphae genera
Spiders of North America
Spiders of Central America